The 1960 United States Senate election in Alaska was held on November 8, 1960. Incumbent Democratic U.S. Senator Bob Bartlett was re-elected to a full term in office, defeating Republican dentist Lee McKinley.

Republican primary

Candidates
Lawrence M. Brayton
 Lee McKinley, dentist and Territorial Representative 1953–55

Results

General election

Results

See also 
 1960 United States Senate elections

References 

Alaska
1960
1960 Alaska elections